Aslayevo (Ahılay) is a rural locality (a village) in Baimovsky Selsoviet, Abzelilovsky District, Bashkortostan, Russia. The population was 397 as of 2010. There are 12 streets.

Geography 
Aslayevo is located 87 km north of Askarovo (the district's administrative centre) by road. Battalovo is the nearest rural locality.

References 

Rural localities in Abzelilovsky District